Robinson–Gardner Building, also known as the Robinson Brothers Building, is a historic commercial building located at Gastonia, Gaston County, North Carolina.  It was built in 1899, and is a two-story, three bay, brick building with Renaissance Revival style design elements.  The second story of the front facade features a round arch with a decorative cartouche at the keystone position and terra cotta swirls at the bases.  Within the arch is a pressed metal swag between a pair of ribboned wreaths pierced by vertical torches.  Above the arch, pressed metal wreaths hold another, larger, metal swag.

It was listed on the National Register of Historic Places in 1999. It is located in the Downtown Gastonia Historic District.

References

Commercial buildings on the National Register of Historic Places in North Carolina
Renaissance Revival architecture in North Carolina
Commercial buildings completed in 1899
Buildings and structures in Gaston County, North Carolina
National Register of Historic Places in Gaston County, North Carolina
Individually listed contributing properties to historic districts on the National Register in North Carolina
1899 establishments in North Carolina